The Iomrautvaam is a river in Chukotka Autonomous Okrug, Russia.

The Iomrautvaam is the longest tributary of the Khatyrka river.

Course
The Iomrautvaam has its source in the Komeutyuyam Range of the Koryak Highlands. It flows in a roughly northeastern direction in the northern section of the range. Finally it meets the right bank of the Khatyrka  from its mouth, close to the northeastern end of the ridge.

Khatyrka meteorite
It was found during an expedition to Chukotka in the summer of 2011 buried in a 7,000-year-old layer of dirt and was named Khatyrka meteorite.

Flora and fauna
The river basin is characterized by tundra vegetation, including mosses, lichens, dwarf shrubs, and sedges.

See also
Khatyrkite
List of rivers of Russia

References

External links
Astronomy.com - An old meteor yields a new surprise: a never-before-seen material
Collisions in outer space produced an icosahedral phase in the Khatyrka meteorite never observed previously in the laboratory
Khatyrka meteorite found to have third quasicrystal
The Penzhina-West Kamchatka folded zone and the Ukelayat-Sredinnyi block in the structure of the Koryak Highland and Kamchatka

Rivers of Chukotka Autonomous Okrug
Koryak Mountains